A. bradleyi may refer to:

Andrena bradleyi, a bee
Anopheles bradleyi, a mosquito of the southeastern United States
Asplenium bradleyi, a fern of the east-central United States